Edmonton and Area Land Trust (EALT) is a regional non-profit organization based in Edmonton, Alberta, Canada. EALT promotes conservation of the natural heritage of Edmonton and area through private stewardship, and is registered as a charitable agency with the Canada Revenue Agency. The land trust stewards nine natural areas in the Edmonton area.

Method 
EALT approaches the conservation of natural areas through land trust using three basic tools:
Land acquisition through purchase or donation
Conservation easement
Education and stewardship

History 
The EALT was established in 2007 by a group of six local founding Members:
City of Edmonton
Edmonton Community Foundation
Edmonton Nature Club
Urban Development Institute - Greater Edmonton Chapter
Land Stewardship Centre of Canada
Legacy Lands Conservation Society

Conservation lands 
EALT secures and conserves ecologically significant lands in the Edmonton region. These include:

Boisvert’s Greenwoods
Bunchberry Meadows
Coates
Conservation Easement in Parkland County
Glory Hills
Golden Ranches

Hicks
Larch Sanctuary
Lu Carbyn Nature Sanctuary
Ministik
Pipestone Creek
Smith Blackburn Homestead

See also 
 Wildlife Preservation Canada
 Ecotrust Canada

References

External links 
Edmonton & Area Land Trust

Environmental organizations based in Alberta
Organizations based in Edmonton
Nature conservation organizations based in Canada
Land trusts